William J. Blakistone (died January 28, 1882) was an American politician and lawyer. He served as a member of the Maryland House of Delegates from 1827 to 1834 and in 1847. He served as the Speaker of the Maryland House of Delegates in 1834 and 1837.

Early life
William J. Blakistone was born near Port Tobacco Village, Maryland, in Charles County, Maryland, to Colonel Thomas Blakistone. His father was a lawyer. At the age of twenty, Blakistone was admitted to the bar in Leonardtown, Maryland.

Career
Blakistone served as a member of the Maryland House of Delegates, representing St. Mary's County, from 1827 to 1834 and in 1847. He served as Speaker of the Maryland House of Delegates in 1834 and 1847. In 1832, he served as speaker pro tempore. He served in the constitutional convention of 1850–1851.

Personal life
Blakistone died on January 28, 1882, in Baltimore. He was 78 years old.

References

Year of birth unknown
People from Charles County, Maryland
People from St. Mary's County, Maryland
1882 deaths
Maryland lawyers
Speakers of the Maryland House of Delegates